Acrolophus tretus is a moth of the family Acrolophidae. It is found in Trinidad.

References

Moths described in 1925
tretus